1999 is a 2009 Canadian crime drama film written and directed by Lenin M. Sivam, world premiered at the 2009 Vancouver International Film Festival (VIFF).

The film explores the Toronto Sri Lankan gang scene in the late 90s. With a time frame that spans less than 24 hours, it's a film that attempts to delve deep inside the Tamil gang community. It opens with a shooting that results in the end of a peace treaty between two rival gangs in Scarborough. With investigators closing in and rival gang members out for revenge, 1999 concentrates its time mapping out the toll gang participation takes not only on the individual, but the direct impacts it has on family and community.

The film received the CBC Audience Choice Award at 2010 ReelWorld Film Festival and it became the top 10 Canadian films at Vancouver International Film Festival  and it also received Midnight Sun Award at 2010 Oslo Tamil Film Festival.

Recognitions 
CBC Reel Audience Choice Award, ReelWorld Film Festival in April 2010
Best Film Award (Midnight Sun), Oslo Tamil Film Festival in February 2010
Top 10 Canadian Films, Vancouver International Film Festival in October 2009
Official Selection,  Toronto Tamil Studies Conference in May 2010
Best Feature Film Award, Toronto Independent Art Film Society (IAFS) in June 2010
Official Selection,  University of Toronto Cinema Studies Student Union (CINSSU)  in March 2010
Official Selection, York University Centre for Asian Research (YCAR) in September 2010
Part of the 'Best Features' Showcase,  Toronto 2010 Moving Image Film Festival (MIFF) in October 2010
Official Selection, Swiss South Indian Film Festival (SSIFF) in October 2010
Official Selection, Illankai Tamil Sangam (ITS) in November 2010
Official Selection, Canadian Tamil Film Festival (CTFF) in January 2011
Official Selection, London Happy Soul Festival (HSF) in June 2011
Best Feature Film Award, Chennai Ulagayutha International Tamil Film Festival (CUITFF) in July 2011

Cast

Soundtrack
The soundtrack of 1999 was composed by Raj Thillaiyampalam except for tracks "Struggle" and "Angel Remix", which were composed by Hemo from Lyrically Strapped. It was produced by Lenin M. Sivam.

References

External links 
 
 

2009 films
2009 crime drama films
Films set in Toronto
Films set in 1999
Canadian crime drama films
2009 crime thriller films
2000s gang films
2000s Tamil-language films
Sri Lankan drama films
2000s Canadian films